Shulini (pronounced shūlini) is a ragam in Carnatic music (musical scale of South Indian classical music). It is the 35th melakarta rāgam in the 72 melakarta rāgam system of Carnatic music. It is also spelled as Sulini, Shoolini or Soolini. It is called Shailadesākshi or Shailadaeshi in Muthuswami Dikshitar school of Carnatic music.

Structure and Lakshana

It is the 5th rāgam in the 6th chakra Rutu. The mnemonic name is Rutu-Ma. The mnemonic phrase is sa ru gu ma pa dhi nu. Its  structure (ascending and descending scale) is as follows (see swaras in Carnatic music for details on below notation and terms):
: 
: 

The notes used in this scale are shatsruthi rishabham, antara gandharam, shuddha madhyamam, chathusruthi dhaivatham and kakali nishadham.

As it is a melakarta rāgam, by definition it is a sampoorna rāgam (has all seven notes in ascending and descending scale). It is the shuddha madhyamam equivalent of Kosalam, which is the 71st melakarta scale.

Janya rāgams 
Shulini has a couple of minor janya rāgams (derived scales) associated with it. See List of janya rāgams for list of scales associated with Shulini.

Compositions
A few compositions set to Shulini are:

Prana natha by Thyagaraja
Paramukhamadeno by Koteeswara Iyer
Nalinanarayani by Dr. M. Balamuralikrishna
Paalayaashumaam Shulini by Dr. M. Balamuralikrishna

Related rāgams
This section covers the theoretical and scientific aspect of this rāgam.

Shulini's notes when shifted using Graha bhedam, yields 3 other melakarta rāgams, namely, Shanmukhapriya, Dhenuka and Chitrambari. Graha bhedam is the step taken in keeping the relative note frequencies same, while shifting the shadjam to the next note in the rāgam. For further details and an illustration refer Graha bhedam on Shanmukhapriya.

Notes

References

Melakarta ragas